Stigmatophora is a genus of moths in the family Erebidae. The genus was described by Staudinger in 1881.

Species
 Stigmatophora acerba Leech, 1899
 Stigmatophora chekiangensis Daniel, 1951
 Stigmatophora confusa Daniel, 1951
 Stigmatophora conjuncta C.-L. Fang, 1991
 Stigmatophora flava Bremer & Grey, 1852
 Stigmatophora grisea Hering, 1936
 Stigmatophora hainanensis C.-L. Fang, 1991
 Stigmatophora leacrita (Swinhoe, 1894)
 Stigmatophora likiangensis Daniel, 1951
 Stigmatophora micans Bremer & Grey, 1852
 Stigmatophora obraztsovi Daniel, 1951
 Stigmatophora palmata Moore, 1878
 Stigmatophora rhodophila Walker, 1864
 Stigmatophora rubivena C.-L. Fang, 1991
 Stigmatophora strigivenata Hampson, 1894
 Stigmatophora torrens Butler, 1879
 Stigmatophora tridens Wileman, 1910

Former species
 Stigmatophora disticha Meyrick, 1894
 Stigmatophora roseivena Hampson, 1894

References

External links

Lithosiini
Moth genera